Naan Kadavul Illai is a 2023 Indian Tamil-language action drama film directed by S. A. Chandrasekhar and starring Samuthirakani and Sakshi Agarwal in the lead roles. It was released on 3 February 2023.

Cast 
Samuthirakani as Senthooran
Sakshi Agarwal as Leena
Saravanan as Veerappan
S. A. Chandrasekhar
Ineya
Yuvan Mayilsamy
Diana Sri
Rohini
Imman Annachi
selva kumar

Production 
The film began production during October 2020, with S. A. Chandrasekhar launching a directorial venture after media reports suggested that Capmaari (2019) would be his last film. The shoot of the film was completed by 2021, with promotions beginning during September 2021. On her action-related role in the film, Sakshi Agarwal took up stunt training from Kanal Kannan.

Soundtrack
Soundtrack was composed by Siddharth Vipin.
Kanne En Kanmaniye - Saindhavi, S. A. Chandrasekhar
Oho Villain - Emcee Rude

Reception 
The film was released on 3 February 2023 across Tamil Nadu. A critic from Cinema Express wrote "mediocrity thrives in this reckless revenge drama" and that the film was a "self-indulgent, overlong, incoherent rehash of the SAC formula". A critic from Dina Thanthi gave the film a negative review.

References

External links 
 

 2023 films
 2020s Tamil-language films
Indian action films
Indian vigilante films